The Sandhöhlen are a natural monument in the German state of Saxony-Anhalt. They are two sand caves known individually as the Große Sandhöhle and Kleine Sandhöhle ("Great Sand Cave" and "Small Sand Cave"). The caves are located in a wooded area called im Heers below the fortress and crags of Regenstein north of the town of  Blankenburg (Harz). It is surmised that a Germanic thingstead was held here in protohistoric times.
On the Große Sandhöhle is a checkpoint (no. 81) in the Harzer Wandernadel hiking network which was voted by hikers as the most beautiful checkpoint of the year in 2009.

Blankenburg (Harz)
Natural monuments in Saxony-Anhalt